The Gathering is an album by the pianist Geri Allen, recorded in 1998 and released on the Verve label.

Reception 

AllMusic stated: "As complete and realized as many of Allen's recordings are, this one displays all of her immense powers coming to light at the same time. It's immaculately programmed, perfectly executed music that has a haunting quality overall, but enough punch, innovation, and style to rank it highly among her best projects, and comes highly recommended".
JazzTimes stated: "As opportunities increase and as her experience in the music broadens, it becomes all the more clear that Geri Allen is one of our most richly talented jazz musicians. For her first Verve session, Ms. Allen's compositional focus is keen and clear, very reflective and at times quite introspective".

Track listing
 "The Gathering" - 5:22
 "Dark Prince" - 5:47	
 "Sleepin' Pretty" - 6:48
 "Light Matter" - 6:56
 "Baby's Breath (For Little Barbara)" - 1:13
 "Ray" - 5:22
 "Soul Beir" - 6:02	
 "Joy and Wonder" - 4:40
 "Gabriel's Royal Blue Reals" - 6:31
 "Daybreak and Dreams" - 5:41
 "Angels" - 6:42

Personnel 
Geri Allen - piano
Wallace Roney - trumpet, flugelhorn 
Robin Eubanks - trombone
Dwight Andrews - piccolo, alto flute, bass flute, bass clarinet
Vernon Reid - electric guitar, acoustic guitar 
Ralphe Armstrong - 7-string bass
Buster Williams - bass 
Lenny White - drums
Mino Cinelu - percussion

References 

1998 albums
Geri Allen albums
Verve Records albums
Albums produced by Teo Macero